Every county in Wales has a voluntary sector infrastructure body, generically called a County Voluntary Council or CVC. The key role of a CVC is to provide advice and information to local voluntary and community groups on volunteering, funding sources and a wide range of other issues.

At an all Wales national level the sector's infrastructure body is Wales Council for Voluntary Action (WCVA). The 19 local County Voluntary Councils in Wales, and the national support body WCVA, make up a network of support organisations for the third sector in Wales called Third Sector Support Wales.

In England the term Council for Voluntary Service is used rather than CVC.

List of CVCs in Wales

List of CVCs as advised by Wales Council for Voluntary Action (WCVA)

Notes and references

Charities based in Wales